Schinia niveicosta is a moth of the family Noctuidae. It is found from south-western Utah and western and south-eastern Arizona, west to southern California and southern Nevada.

Most adults are recorded in March and April, but there are also records for May, September to November and January to February.

The larvae feed on Palafoxia linearis.

External links
Images
A Review of the Schinia regia species complex

Schinia
Moths of North America
Moths described in 1906